Rudolf Prehn GmbH is an international producer and trader of wines, liquors and spirits.

Since 1930, Rudolf Prehn GmbH has become known for innovative product development in the wine and spirit industry.

Rudolf Prehn GmbH is a member of the International German Wine and Spirits Association.

Media References: Meininger's Who is Who 
TVB Pearl 
Weinwirtschaft 19 May 2012 
Weinwirtschaft 22 January 2003

See also
 Brandy de Jerez

References

External links
Official website

Wine-related events
Wine industry organizations